Momar Ndoye (born 10 March 1992) is a Senegalese professional footballer who plays as a midfielder for Gibraltarian club Boca Gibraltar.

Career
Born in Pikine, Ndoye began his career in Spain, making his debut for the Atlético Madrid B side on 16 August 2011 against RSD Alcalá in the Segunda División B. He came on as a halftime substitute for Roberto as Madrid B drew 1–1. After playing for the reserves in the third division for a while, Ndoye earned a call-up to the Atlético Madrid first-team and appeared on the bench for the side on 5 April 2012 against Hannover 96 in the Europa League. He did not see any game time however. Ndoye also appeared on the bench for Madrid in the UEFA Champions League on 26 November 2013 against Zenit Saint Petersburg. He again did not see time on the field.

In 2015, Ndoye left Madrid to sign for Muro. He stayed at the club for a year before leaving Spain and signing for Indian Super League side Pune City. He made his professional debut with the club on 3 October 2016 against Mumbai City. He came on as a halftime substitute for Gustavo Oberman as Pune City lost 1–0.

Career statistics

References

External links 

Indian Super League Profile.

1992 births
Living people
Senegalese footballers
Association football midfielders
Segunda División B players
Tercera División players
Atlético Madrid B players
Arandina CF players
UD San Sebastián de los Reyes players
Indian Super League players
FC Pune City players
F.C. Boca Gibraltar players
Senegalese expatriate footballers
Senegalese expatriate sportspeople in Spain
Senegalese expatriate sportspeople in India
Expatriate footballers in Spain
Expatriate footballers in India